The Antamina mine in the Andes Mountains of Peru is one of the largest copper/zinc mines in the world. It is an open pit mine owned by Teck Resources which had an estimated life of mine at 15 years. It also produced molybdenum. It produced 390,800 tons of copper concentrate in 2006, 461,000 tons  in 2013. The total capital expenditure of the mine by 2013 was US$2.3 billion. İt is located at an altitude of 4,300 meters above sea level.

The mine is expected to have its stockpiles depleted by 2022 and is thus scheduled to cease production by 2019. Klohn Crippen Berger (KCB) is in charge of the preparation for the Closure Plan.

See also 
Antamina Tailings Dam
Zinc mining
List of mines in Peru
Copper mining

References

External links
  
 
 

Ancash Region
Copper mines in Peru
Open-pit mines
Teck Resources
Molybdenum mines